Norman Gordon (6 August 1911 – 2 September 2014) was a South African cricketer who played in five Test matches during the 1938–39 South African cricket season.

He was born in Boksburg, Transvaal. He is the only male Test cricketer to live beyond 100 years of age. Gordon became the oldest-ever Test cricketer on 23 March 2011, when he surpassed New Zealander Eric Tindill, who died on 1 August 2010, approximately four months before his 100th birthday.

Personal life
Gordon was Jewish, and was born in Boksburg, Transvaal.

Cricket career
Gordon played first-class cricket for Transvaal from 1933–34 as a right-handed fast bowler and a tail-end right-handed batsman.

He made his Test debut against England in December 1938, playing every Test of the five-match series. In the first Test, he took his best Test match figures of 7–162, including 5–103 in the first innings. He was stumped by Les Ames off the bowling of Tom Goddard for a first-ball duck in the drawn match. In the second match he took 5–157 in England's only innings, but was again stumped by Ames off the bowling of Goddard for 0 in another drawn match.

In the third match, Gordon took 2–127 in England's only innings and was out for 1 and 0, falling to Ken Farnes and Hedley Verity as England won by an innings and 13 runs. In the fourth match, he took 2–47 and 3–58 but did not bat in the drawn Test. In the final Test Gordon took match figures of 1–256 and was not out in each innings, scoring 0 and 7. This match was the famous Timeless Test, which took 10 days and was eventually declared a draw by agreement between the teams. It was Gordon's final Test match.

He took his best innings figures of 6–61, followed by 3–86 in the second innings, for Transvaal against Natal at Johannesburg in 1939–40. He continued playing for Transvaal until the 1948–49 season.

Later life

Gordon ran a sports shop in central Johannesburg. He was the last living male to have played Test cricket before World War II. He turned 100 in August 2011 and lived in central Johannesburg. Following his death, he was succeeded as the oldest living first-class cricketer by John Manners.

See also
List of select Jewish cricketers
List of oldest Test cricketers
List of centenarians in sport
 List of South Africa cricketers who have taken five-wicket hauls on Test debut

References

External links
 

1911 births
2014 deaths
South African centenarians
South Africa Test cricketers
South African cricketers
Jewish South African sportspeople
Gauteng cricketers
Jewish cricketers
Cricketers who have taken five wickets on Test debut
Men centenarians
People from Boksburg